Exacum caeruleum is a species of plant in the Gentianaceae family. It is endemic to Yemen.  Its natural habitat is subtropical or tropical dry shrubland.

References

caeruleum
Endemic flora of Socotra
Critically endangered flora of Asia
Taxonomy articles created by Polbot
Taxa named by Isaac Bayley Balfour